Riga is one of the five multi-member constituencies of the Saeima, the national legislature of Latvia. The constituency was established in 1922 when the Saeima was established following Latvia's independence from the Soviet Union. It consists of the city of Riga and overseas voters. The constituency currently elects 36 of the 100 members of the Saeima using the open party-list proportional representation electoral system. At the 2022 parliamentary election it had 565,297 registered electors.

Electoral system
Riga currently elects 36 of the 100 members of the Saeima using the open party-list proportional representation electoral system. Constituency seats are allocated using the Sainte-Laguë method. Only parties that reach the 5% national threshold compete for constituency seats (4% in 1993).

Election results

Summary

Detailed

2020s

2022
Results of the 2022 parliamentary election held on 1 October 2022:

The following candidates were elected:
Skaidrīte Ābrama (PRO), 29,828 votes; Augusts Brigmanis (ZZS), 17,324 votes; Oļegs Burovs (LPV), 27,239 votes; Edmunds Cepurītis (PRO), 29,474 votes; Svetlana Čulkova (S!), 30,351 votes; Dāvis Mārtiņš Daugavietis (JV), 61,182 votes; Mārcis Jencītis (LPV), 27,448 votes; Andrejs Judins (JV), 69,339 votes; Igors Judins (S!), 29,780 votes; Inese Kalniņa (JV), 60,755 votes; Irma Kalniņa (JV), 61,838 votes; Zanda Kalniņa-Lukaševica (JV), 61,317 votes; Aleksandrs Kiršteins (NA), 22,785 votes; Jefimijs Klementjevs (S!), 29,698 votes; Rihards Kols (NA), 24,191 votes; Agnese Krasta (JV), 60,822 votes; Kristaps Krištopans (LPV), 26,979 votes; Andris Kulbergs (AS), 22,606 votes; Gunārs Kūtris (ZZS), 18,438 votes; Inese Lībiņa-Egnere (JV), 67,168 votes; Lauris Lizbovskis (AS), 21,352 votes; Nataļja Marčenko-Jodko (S!), 30,322 votes; Ināra Mūrniece (NA), 25,226 votes; Antoņina Ņenaševa (PRO), 30,296 votes; Jānis Patmalnieks (JV), 60,887 votes; Nauris Puntulis (NA), 23,010 votes; Igors Rajevs (AS), 24,272 voetes; Edgars Rinkēvičs (JV), 95,119 votes; Aleksejs Rosļikovs (S!), 46,532 votes; Uģis Rotbergs (JV), 61,056 votes; Zane Skujiņa (JV), 61,146 votes; Ainārs Šlesers (LPV), 41,546 votes; Didzis Šmits (AS), 22,822 votes; Andris Sprūds (PRO), 31,739 votes; Andris Šuvajevs (PRO), 30,454 votes; and Andrejs Vilks (ZZS), 16,945 votes.

2010s

2018
Results of the 2018 parliamentary election held on 6 October 2018:

The following candidates were elected:
Iveta Benhena-Bēkena (KPV LV), 38,393 votes; Anda Čakša (ZZS), 15,423 votes; Vjačeslavs Dombrovskis (SDPS), 121,611 votes; Gatis Eglītis (JKP), 39,631 votes; Aldis Gobzems (KPV LV), 48,273 votes; Marija Golubeva (AP), 41,518 votes; Ritvars Jansons (NA), 28,310 votes; Andrejs Judins (JV), 23,311 votes; Nikolajs Kabanovs (SDPS), 95,056 votes; Artuss Kaimiņš (KPV LV), 58,542 votes; Ojārs Ēriks Kalniņš (JV), 23,533 votes; Aleksandrs Kiršteins (NA), 28,626 votes; Andrejs Klementjevs (SDPS), 105,979 votes; Ivans Klementjevs (SDPS), 96,071 votes; Rihards Kols (NA), 30,737 votes; Tālis Linkaits (JKP), 38,775 votes; Regīna Ločmele-Luņova (SDPS), 104,889 votes; Dace Melbārde (NA), 36,925 votes; Linda Ozola (JKP), 37,945 votes; Daniels Pavļuts (AP), 53,344 votes; Igor Pimenov (SDPS), 95,706 votes; Ivars Puga (KPV LV), 38,822 votes; Dana Reizniece-Ozola (ZZS), 18,466 votes; Edgars Rinkēvičs (JV), 28,898 votes; Artūrs Rubiks (SDPS), 95,464 votes; Didzis Šmits (KPV LV), 41,081 votes; Mārtiņš Staķis (AP), 43,839 votes; Julija Stepanenko (SDPS), 99,005 votes; Juta Strīķe (JKP), 43,620 votes; Ļubova Švecova (SDPS), 95,347 votes; Vita Anda Tērauda (AP), 43,316 votes; Boris Tsilevitch (SDPS), 97,857 votes; Jānis Urbanovičs (SDPS), 105,095 votes; Inese Voika (AP), 41,739 votes; and Reinis Znotiņš (JKP), 37,894 votes.

2014
Results of the 2014 parliamentary election held on 4 October 2014:

The following candidates were elected:
Guntis Belēvičs (ZZS), 28,280 votes; Inga Bite (LRA), 19,899 votes; Lolita Čigāne (V), 66,795 votes; Einārs Cilinskis (NA), 60,432 votes; Andrejs Judins (V), 75,602 votes; Artuss Kaimiņš (LRA), 40,481 votes; Ojārs Ēriks Kalniņš (V), 75,595 votes; Andrejs Klementjevs (SDPS), 135,129 votes; Ivans Klementjevs (SDPS), 121,733 votes; Rihards Kozlovskis (V), 68,896 votes; Māris Kučinskis (ZZS), 26,398 votes; Ilmārs Latkovskis (NA), 55,875 votes; Regīna Ločmele-Luņova (SDPS), 121,629 votes; Aleksejs Loskutovs (V), 70,801 votes; Dace Melbārde (NA), 61,632 votes; Romāns Mežeckis (NSL), 17,703 votes; Sergejs Mirskis (SDPS), 122,915 votes; Nikita Nikiforov (SDPS), 119,233 votes; Igor Pimenov (SDPS), 120,258 votes; Sergejs Potapkins (SDPS), 120,873 votes; Dzintars Rasnačs (NA), 57,750 votes; Inguna Rībena (NA), 54,599 votes; Edgars Rinkēvičs (V), 90,577 votes; Artūrs Rubiks (SDPS), 121,114 votes; Kārlis Seržants (ZZS), 28,134 votes; Mārtiņš Šics (LRA), 27,533 votes; Julija Stepanenko (SDPS), 122,383 votes; Inguna Sudraba (NSL), 29,402 votes; Boris Tsilevitch (SDPS), 127,173 votes; Jānis Urbanovičs (SDPS), 146,266 votes; Ilze Viņķele (V), 67,901 votes; and Mihails Zemļinskis (SDPS), 118,977 votes.

2011
Results of the 2011 parliamentary election held on 17 September 2011:

The following candidates were elected:
Inga Bite (ZRP), 44,373 votes; Andris Buiķis (V), 53,572 votes; Einārs Cilinskis (NA), 45,546 votes; Irina Cvetkova (SC), 126,399 votes; Vjačeslavs Dombrovskis (ZRP), 48,783 votes; Kārlis Eņģelis (ZRP), 44,435 votes; Andrejs Judins (V), 54,567 votes; Nikolajs Kabanovs (SC), 131,866 votes; Ojārs Ēriks Kalniņš (V), 55,627 votes; Andrejs Klementjevs (SC), 142,619 votes; Ilmārs Latkovskis (NA), 43,146 votes; Valdis Liepiņš (ZRP), 44,352 votes; Igors Meļņikovs (SC), 126,124 votes; Sergejs Mirskis (SC), 129,763 votes; Nikita Nikiforov (SC), 126,024 votes; Igor Pimenov (SC), 128,529 votes; Sergejs Potapkins (SC), 126,118 votes; Dzintars Rasnačs (NA), 43,335 votes; Inguna Rībena (V), 53,121 votes; Artūrs Rubiks (SC), 135,752 votes; Kārlis Seržants (ZZS), 18,318 votes; Edmunds Sprūdžs (ZRP), 52,369 votes; Dāvis Stalts (NA), 41,586 votes; Boris Tsilevitch (SC), 135,554 votes; Jānis Urbanovičs (SC), 165,451 votes; Raimonds Vējonis (ZZS), 19,729 votes; Andris Vilks (V), 60,091 votes; Ilze Viņķele (V), 54,149 votes; Mihails Zemļinskis (SC), 127,843 votes; and Igors Zujevs (SC), 125,848 votes.

2010
Results of the 2010 parliamentary election held on 2 October 2010:

The following candidates were elected:
Andris Buiķis (V), 93,278 votes; Lolita Čigāne (V), 96,204 votes; Einārs Cilinskis (NA), 23,674 votes; Ints Dālderis (V), 89,528 votes; Sergey Dolgopolov (SC), 136,444 votes; Aleksejs Holostovs (SC), 121,015 votes; Nikolajs Kabanovs (SC), 126,659 votes; Ojārs Ēriks Kalniņš (V), 92,705 votes; Rasma Kārkliņa (V), 89,870 votes; Andrejs Klementjevs (SC), 134,440 votes; Ģirts Valdis Kristovskis (V), 99,430 votes; Imants Lieģis (V), 89,910 votes; Igors Meļņikovs (SC), 121,742 votes; Sergejs Mirskis (SC), 125,288 votes; Nikita Nikiforov (SC), 121,107 votes; Igor Pimenov (SC), 122,280 votes; Dzintars Rasnačs (NA), 24,123 votes; Inguna Rībena (V), 89,634 votes; Artūrs Rubiks (SC), 126,669 votes; Kārlis Seržants (ZZS), 33,540 votes; Inese Šlesere (PL), 24,430 votes; Ainārs Šlesers (PL), 35,940 votes; Jānis Strazdiņš (ZZS), 32,298 votes; Boris Tsilevitch (SC), 131,615 votes; Jānis Urbanovičs (SC), 174,139 votes; Raimonds Vējonis (ZZS), 36,139 votes; Ilze Viņķele (V), 88,647 votes; Mihails Zemļinskis (SC), 122,040 votes; and Igors Zujevs (SC), 121,140 votes.

2000s

2006
Results of the 2006 parliamentary election held on 7 October 2006:

The following candidates were elected:
Solvita Āboltiņa (JL), 56,437 votes; Ainars Baštiks (LPP/LC), 27,764 votes; Vladimir Buzayev (ЗаПЧЕЛ), 31,332 votes; Ilma Čepāne (JL), 56,584 votes; Juris Dalbiņš (TP), 37,182 votes; Juris Dobelis (TB/LNNK), 25,073 votes; Sergey Dolgopolov (SC), 79,657 votes; Māris Grīnblats (TB/LNNK), 26,442 votes; Nikolajs Kabanovs (ЗаПЧЕЛ), 32,079 votes; Andrejs Klementjevs (SC), 73,196 votes; Sergejs Mirskis (SC), 69,711 votes; Alexander Mirsky (SC), 76,509 votes; Vineta Muižniece (TP), 37,321 votes; Linda Mūrniece (JL), 55,644 votes; Leopolds Ozoliņš (ZZS), 26,479 votes; Yakov Pliner (ЗаПЧЕЛ), 35,327 votes; Pauls Putniņš (ZZS); 26,273 votes; Dzintars Rasnačs (TB/LNNK), 24,067 votes; Inguna Rībena (JL), 54,002 votes; Artūrs Rubiks (SC), 74,633 votes; Kārlis Šadurskis (JL), 54,080 votes; Mareks Segliņš (TP), 37,976 votes; Inese Šlesere (LPP/LC), 24,188 votes; Ainārs Šlesers (LPP/LC), 31,325 votes; Oskars Spurdziņš (TP), 37,468 votes; Jānis Strazdiņš (ZZS), 27,020 votes; Boris Tsilevitch (SC), 72,837 votes; Jānis Urbanovičs (SC), 74,296 votes; and Nils Ušakovs (SC), 89,408 votes.

2002
Results of the 2002 parliamentary election held on 5 October 2002:

The following candidates were elected:
Ainars Baštiks (LPP), 24,929 votes; Gundars Bērziņš (TP), 35,518 votes; Vladimir Buzayev (ЗаПЧЕЛ), 96,747 votes; Valdis Dombrovskis (JL), 78,060 votes; Ina Druviete (JL), 79,896 votes; Māris Gulbis (JL), 84,013 votes; Jānis Jurkāns (ЗаПЧЕЛ), 126,117 votes; Nikolajs Kabanovs (ЗаПЧЕЛ), 97,687 votes; Aigars Kalvītis (TP), 33,208 votes; Valērijs Karpuškins (ЗаПЧЕЛ), 95,320 votes; Aleksandrs Kiršteins (TP), 33,425 votes; Paulis Kļaviņš (LPP), 23,235 votes; Andrejs Klementjevs (ЗаПЧЕЛ), 97,502 votes; Guntars Krasts (TB/LNNK), 24,328 votes; Aigars Pētersons (JL), 77,227 votes; Rihards Pīks (TP), 33,868 votes; Yakov Pliner (ЗаПЧЕЛ), 98,273 votes; Einars Repše (JL), 110,911 votes; Inguna Rībena (JL), 81,218 votes; Kārlis Šadurskis (JL), 78,157 votes; Juris Sokolovskis (ЗаПЧЕЛ), 95,815 votes; Jānis Strazdiņš (ZZS), 17,130 votes; Kārlis Strēlis (JL), 76,713 votes; Boris Tsilevitch (ЗаПЧЕЛ), 99,729 votes; Dainis Turlais (ЗаПЧЕЛ), 99,114 votes; Arvīds Ulme (ZZS), 16,654 votes; Jānis Urbanovičs (ЗаПЧЕЛ), 94,624 votes; and Roberts Zīle (TB/LNNK), 20,943 votes.

1990s

1998
Results of the 1998 parliamentary election held on 3 October 1998:
 

The following candidates were elected:
Egils Baldzēns (LSDA), 30,832 votes;  (JP), 17,575 votes; Indulis Bērziņš (LC), 36,533 votes; Imants Burvis (LSDA), 30,474 votes; Helēna Demakova (TP), 51,538 votes; Oļegs Deņisovs (TSP), 62,208 votes; Juris Dobelis (TB/LNNK), 61,965 votes; Jānis Gaigals (LC), 35,148 votes; Valdis Ģīlis (TP), 51,420 votes; Māris Grīnblats (TB/LNNK), 65,842 votes; Jānis Jurkāns (TSP), 74,687 votes; Aleksandrs Kiršteins (TP), 53,003 votes; Andrejs Klementjevs (TSP), 60,999 votes; Guntars Krasts (TB/LNNK), 68,926 votes; Rišards Labanovskis (LSDA), 32,702 votes; Modris Lujāns (TSP), 60,824 votes; Romāns Mežeckis (JP), 17,070 votes; Karina Pētersone (LC), 35,290 votes; Rihards Pīks (TP), 53,320 votes; Yakov Pliner (TSP), 60,912 votes; Dzintars Rasnačs (TB/LNNK), 57,449 votes; Romualds Ražuks (LC), 34,174 votes; Juris Sinka (TB/LNNK), 58,459 votes; Jānis Škapars (TP), 51,722 votes; Juris Sokolovskis (TSP), 61,545 votes; Boris Tsilevitch (TSP), 62,543 votes; Māris Vītols (TP), 52,718 votes; and Roberts Zīle (TB/LNNK), 63,840 votes.

1995
Results of the 1995 parliamentary election held on 30 September and 1 October 1995:

The following candidates were elected:
Indulis Bērziņš (LC), 30,283 votes; Imants Daudišs (LC), 30,209 votes; Oļegs Deņisovs (LSP), 21,279 votes; Juris Dobelis (LNNK-LZP), 27,326 votes; Vladlens Dozorcevs (TSP), 26,449 votes; Kārlis Jūlijs Druva (LZS-KDS-LDP), 13,910 votes; Aivars Endziņš (LC), 30,707 votes; Māris Grīnblats (TB), 59,731 votes; Jānis Jurkāns (TSP), 32,611 votes; Ivars Jānis Ķezbers (DPS), 35,355 votes; Aleksandrs Kiršteins (LNNK-LZP), 28,152 votes; Paulis Kļaviņš (LZS-KDS-LDP), 14,556 votes; Andrejs Krastiņš (LNNK-LZP), 27,733 votes; Ilga Kreituse (DPS), 33,674 votes; Valdis Krisbergs (DPS), 32,592 votes; Ludmila Kuprijanova (TSP), 25,326 votes; Modris Lujāns (LSP), 20,642 votes; Leopolds Ozoliņš (TB), 51,958 votes; Andrejs Panteļējevs (LC), 33,180 votes; Normunds Pēterkops (TB), 46,205 votes; Aleksandrs Pētersons (TB), 46,643 votes; Andris Rubins (TKL), 24,165 votes; Māris Rudzītis (TKL), 24,288 votes; Juris Sinka (TB), 47,803 votes; Gundars Valdmanis (LVP), 10,295 votes; Juris Zaķis (DPS), 32,228 votes; and Elmārs Zelgalvis (TKL), 23,991 votes.

1993
Results of the 1993 parliamentary election held on 5 and 6 June 1993:

The following candidates were elected:
Andris Ameriks (SL), 42,184 votes; Romāns Apsītis (LC), 63,995 votes; Eduards Berklavs (LNNK), 58,548 votes; Indulis Bērziņš (LC), 66,905 votes; Māris Budovskis (LNNK), 54,575 votes; Igors Bukovskis (SL), 44,336 votes; Māris Grīnblats (TB), 22,222 votes; Aivars Jerumanis (KDS), 20,683 votes; Ēriks Kaža (SL), 42,659 votes; Aleksandrs Kiršteins (LNNK), 57,406 votes; Visvaldis Varnesis Klīve (LZS), 17,536 votes; Odisejs Kostanda (LNNK), 66,851 votes; Nikolajs Krasohins (Р), 19,206 votes; Andrejs Krastiņš (LNNK), 60,076 votes; Ludmila Kuprijanova (SL), 43,408 votes; Kārlis Leiškalns (DCP), 14,742 votes; Egils Levits (LC), 67,608 votes; Ruta Marjaša (LC), 65,862 votes; Andrejs Panteļējevs (LC), 81,377 votes; Aida Prēdele (KDS), 17,383 votes; Jānis Ritenis (LZS), 17,624 votes; Alfrēds Rubiks (Р), 27,511 votes; Andrejs Siliņš (LC), 63,659 votes; and Juris Sinka (TB), 20,288 votes.

1930s

1931
Results of the 1931 parliamentary election held on 3 and 4 October 1931:

1920s

1928
Results of the 1928 parliamentary election held on 6 and 7 October 1928:

1925
Results of the 1925 parliamentary election held on 3 and 4 October 1925:

1922
Results of the 1922 parliamentary election held on 7 and 8 October 1922:

References

Saeima constituency
Saeima constituencies
Saeima constituencies established in 1922